Patriarchate of Seleucia-Ctesiphon may refer to:

the office of the Patriarch of the Church of the East
the Patriarchal Province of Seleucia-Ctesiphon, an ecclesiastical province of which the patriarch was metropolitan